An Auditorium is an area within a theatre, concert hall or other performance space where the audience is located in order to hear and watch the performance.

Auditorium or The Auditorium may also refer to:
Named buildings
 Auditorium Building (Chicago), which incorporates
Auditorium Theatre, owned by Roosevelt University
 Auditorium (Community of Christ), a house of worship and office building in Independence, Missouri
 Auditorium (Torrance High School), Torrance, California, listed on the National Register of Historic Places (NRHP) in Los Angeles County
 Auditorium Building (Chicago), National Historic Landmark in Chicago designed by Adler and Sullivan
 The Auditorium (Geneva, Nebraska), NRHP-listed
 The Auditorium, Melbourne, theatre in Australia
other uses
 Auditorium (video game), a 2008 musical puzzle game by Philadelphia-based studio Cipher Prime
 Auditorium (composition), a 2016 composition for electronica and orchestra by Mason Bates
 "Auditorium," a song by Guided by Voices from their 1995 album Alien Lanes
 a type of acoustic guitar

See also
Auditorium Hotel (disambiguation)
Chautauqua Auditorium (disambiguation)
Civic Auditorium (disambiguation)